Panbeh Chuleh may refer to:
 Panbeh Chuleh-ye Bala
 Panbeh Chuleh-ye Pain